Lucy Cox (born 1988) in Chard, Somerset, UK, is a British abstract artist and curator.

Education

Cox received a Master of Arts (MA) in Culture, Policy and Management from City, University of London, a Bachelor of Arts with Honours (BA Hons) in Fine Art from Wimbledon College of Arts, University of the Arts London and a Foundation Degree (FdA) in Art & Design from Kingston University London in collaboration with School of Art & Design, Kingston College.

Practice 
Cox has exhibited her paintings in the UK and internationally, including an exhibition of British painters in China, and has curated exhibitions in London. Andy Parkinson wrote of her work, "Lucy Cox's playful geometric arrangements, almost inhabiting a believable three dimensional space, seem to celebrate the ways in which colour creates spatial ambiguities and irregularities". Sharples described Cox's paintings as compositions which "reveal vivid organic and geometric shapes, gradations of colour, exchanges and explorations of the figure/ground relationship between translucency and opaqueness", while Robert Priseman describes her abstract paintings as "juxtaposing the autonomy of geometry with repetition and spontaneity". She is a member of Contemporary British Painting and on the advisory board of The Priseman Seabrook Collections.

Selected exhibitions 
2022 - Vitalistic Fantasies, Elysium Gallery, Swansea, UK
2021 - Edge to Edge, The Cello Factory, London
2021 - Being There, Prosaic Projects Gallery, Bloc Studios, Sheffield, UK
2020 - Vitalistic Fantasies, The Cello Factory Gallery, London
2020 - Dear Christine (a Tribute to Christine Keeler), Arthouse 1, London
2019 - Dear Christine (a Tribute to Christine Keeler), Elysium Gallery, Swansea, UK
2019 - Made in Britain; 82 Painters of the 21st Century, Muzeum Narodowe w Gdansk, Poland
2019 - Dear Christine (a Tribute to Christine Keeler), Vane, Newcastle-Upon-Tyne, UK
2018 - New Painting, The Crypt, Marylebone, London
2018 - SFSA Painting Open, Second Floor Studios & Arts, London
2017/18 -  Contemporary Masters from Britain, Tianjin Academy of Fine Arts Museum, China
2017/18 - Testcard P, The Crypt, Marylebone, London
 2017 - Contemporary Masters from Britain, Jiangsu Provincial Art Museum, Nanjing, China
2017 - Contemporary Masters from Britain, Jiangsu Museum of Arts and Crafts (Artall), Nanjing, China
2017 - Anything Goes? Art Bermondsey Project Space, London
2017 -  Contemporary Masters from Britain, Yantai Art Museum, China
2017 - Colour A Kind Of Bliss, The Crypt, Marylebone, London
2016 - Summer Exhibition, The Quay Arts, Isle of Wight, UK
2015/16 - Piercing The Veil, Simmons Contemporary, Simmons & Simmons, London
2015 - Geometry: Wonky and Otherwise, Déda, Derby, UK

Selected curation 
2020 - I'm in a Window Mood, The Aura of Abstraction on-line 
2017 - Colour A Kind Of Bliss, The Crypt, Marylebone, London
2016 - Multiple Choices, Simmons Contemporary, Simmons & Simmons, London

Collections 
The Priseman Seabrook Collection, UK

Jiangsu Provincial Art Museum, Nanjing, China

Publications & Media 
2021 - Darkness at Noon: Online Panel Discussion, Contemporary British Painting
2021 - Catching Mice: Peter Clossick interviewed by Lucy Cox, The Jackdaw, May/June 2021
2020 - The Exploration of Suffering and the Celebration of Beauty: An Interview with Robert Priseman, Lucy Cox
2019 - Dear Christine; A Tribute To Christine Keeler, Fionn Wilson (Ed.)
2018-2020 - Painters Today, Podcast Series, Lucy Cox
2018 - Made in Britain; 82 Painters of the 21st Century, Robert Priseman
2017 - Contemporary Masters From Britain: 80 British Painters of the 21st Century, Robert Priseman
2017 - Colour A Kind Of Bliss, Lucy Cox & Freya Purdue
2016 - Multiple Choices, Michael O'Donoghue & Lucy Cox, Simmons & Simmons
2015 - Piercing the Veil, Jon Sharples, Simmons & Simmons

References

External links 
 The Aura of Abstraction
 Contemporary British Painting
 Priseman Seabrook Collection

21st-century British painters
British women painters
Living people
British curators
English contemporary artists
Alumni of the University of the Arts London
21st-century British women artists
British abstract artists
1988 births
Alumni of City, University of London
People from Chard, Somerset